Musée d'Aquitaine tram stop is located on line  of the tramway de Bordeaux.

Location 
The station is located by course Louis Pasteur in Bordeaux.

Junctions 
Junctions with the following lines Cours Victor Hugo

 Bus de la TBC:

À proximité
 Musée d'Aquitaine

See also 
 TBC
 Tramway de Bordeaux

External links 
 

Bordeaux tramway stops
Tram stops in Bordeaux
Railway stations in France opened in 2004